Parahippus ("near to horse"), is an extinct equid, a relative of modern horses, asses and zebras. It lived from 24 to 17 million years ago, during the Miocene epoch. Their fossils have been found in North America, primarily in the Great Plains region and Florida.

Description 

Parahippus was larger than Miohippus, with longer legs and face. The bones in the legs were fused and this, along with muscle development, allowed Parahippus to move with forward-and-back strides. Flexible leg rotation was eliminated, so that the animal was better adapted to fast forward running on open ground without moving from side to side. Most importantly, Parahippus was able to stand on its middle toe, instead of walking on pads, which gave it the ability to run faster; its weight was supported by ligaments under the fetlock to the big central toe.

Since leafy food had become scarce, these animals were forced to subsist on the newly evolved grasses that were by now taking over the plains, and their teeth adapted accordingly. The extra molar crest that was variable in Miohippus became permanent in Parahippus. The molars developed high crowns and a hard covering for grinding the grass, which was typically covered with high-silica dust and sand.

See also

 Evolution of the horse

References

 Horse Evolution
 Evolution of the Horse

Miocene horses
Miocene odd-toed ungulates
Transitional fossils
White River Fauna
Prehistoric placental genera
Miocene genus extinctions
Miocene mammals of North America
Fossil taxa described in 1858
Taxa named by Joseph Leidy